Ctenarchis is a genus of moths of the Carposinidae family, containing only one species, Ctenarchis cramboides. This species is endemic to New Zealand. It is classified as "At Risk, Naturally Uncommon" by the Department of Conservation.

Taxonomy 
C. cramboides was first described by John S. Dugdale in 1995 using material collected by C. J. Green and himself at Spraggs Bush in the Waitākere Ranges on 9 March 1984. The holotype specimen is held at the New Zealand Arthropod Collection.

Etymology 
The name Ctenarchis refers to the pectinate (comblike) antenna (kteinos is Greek for a comb and -"archis", a conventional carposinid suffix).

Description 
The wingspan is 35–40 mm for males and about 50 mm for females. The forewings are creamy white, with small sparse costal and subterminal maculations (spots) in brown, and two short longitudinal streaks, one basally on the costa. The head, thorax and abdomen are creamy white and the labial palpi are dark brown laterally. The hindwings are grey-buff, although darker brown-grey in females.

Distribution 
This species is endemic to New Zealand. It is only known from Auckland and Northland. Most specimens have been collected in Titirangi.

Biology and behaviour 
Adult specimens have been collected from December to March and in July and July using either light or malaise traps. At rest, the species holds its wings mostly around the body though partly overlapping.

Host plants and habitat 
The host plants for the larvae of this species is unknown.

Conservation Status 
C. cramboides has been classified as having the "At Risk, Naturally Uncommon" conservation status under the New Zealand Threat Classification System.

References

Carposinidae
Moths of New Zealand
Endemic fauna of New Zealand
Moths described in 1995
Endangered biota of New Zealand
Endemic moths of New Zealand